Athabasca University Press (or AU Press) is a scholarly publisher and a division of Athabasca University. Since its 2007 founding, the Press has published over 120 peer-reviewed books, which include titles in North American Western history, labour studies, distance and online education, and indigenous studies. AU Press has also published works of fiction, drama, poetry, and autobiography, both original and translated. A number of the Press's titles have garnered academic awards, in fields ranging from history and archaeology to creative non-fiction to distance education; other titles have been recognized for their design. AU Press also publishes websites with content that has scholarly parameters and standards, especially grey literature on distance learning; and primary sources in labour studies, Métis and Aboriginal Studies, gender studies, and the environment.

AU Press allows users to freely access digital publications from its website, in addition to producing and selling printed books. All works are licensed under a Creative Commons license, in which users may reproduce the material for non-commercial purposes, provided that they give credit to the original author.

The press is currently a member of the Association of University Presses.

References

Press
University presses of Canada
Open access publishers
Publishing companies established in 2007
Canadian companies established in 2007
2007 establishments in Alberta
Athabasca University Press books